The Arabian shrew (Crocidura arabica) is a species of mammal in the family Soricidae. It is found in Oman and Yemen. They are solitary carnivores.

References

Crocidura
Mammals described in 1988
Taxonomy articles created by Polbot